Mudaliar Ahamed Lebbe Sinne Lebbe, also known as Ahamedlebbe Sinnalebbe (born 2 June 1902), was a Ceylonese merchant and former Member of Parliament representing Batticaloa District.

At the 1st parliamentary election held in 1947 Sinne Lebbe ran, as the United National Party candidate, in the seat of Batticaloa. He received 4,740 votes (35.4% of the total vote) defeating four other Independents.

On 16 January 1948 Sinne Lebbe tabled before parliament the following motion; 

The motion however was drafted by J. R. Jayewardene, the member for Kelaniya, who persuaded Sinne Lebbe to move the motion, as he was a Muslim thereby creating confusion amongst any likely opposition by the Tamil members of parliament. The motion was seconded by A. Ekanayake Gunasinha, the member for Colombo Central Electoral District. Sinne Lebbe did not participate in the ensuing debate.
 
As a result of the opposition to the motion, the Prime Minister D. S. Senanayake, on 27 January 1948, formed of a parliamentary committee, which resulted in the royal flag, with the addition of two strips of orange and green, being adopted as the national flag.

Sinne Lebbe sought to be re-elected at the 2nd parliamentary election held in May 1952 but was unsuccessful losing to R. B. Kadramer, an Independent, by 3,460 votes (Sinne Lebbe only securing 41% of the total vote).

Both Sinne Lebbe's son, Abdul Lathiff and his grandson, Ahamed Rizvi, served as members of parliament representing Batticaloa in 1965-1970 and 1985-1989 respectively.

See also 
List of political families in Sri Lanka

References

1902 births
Date of death missing
Members of the 1st Parliament of Ceylon
United National Party politicians
Sri Lankan Moor businesspeople